Styrax foveolaria is a species of tree in the family Styracaceae. It is native to Peru and Ecuador. It has been classified by the IUCN as a vulnerable species.

References

foveolaria
Vulnerable plants
Trees of Peru
Trees of Ecuador
Taxonomy articles created by Polbot